The Ford Starliner was the fastback version of the flagship Galaxie line of full-size Fords in 1960 and 1961.

In 1960, the Starliner hardtop, along with the Sunliner convertible, made up the Galaxie Special Series.  It utilized the high-level Galaxie trim, however the Galaxie name on the trunklid was replaced by Starliner script. In 1961 the Starliner hardtop and Sunliner convertible were part of the Galaxie Series.

The Ford Starliner shares its name with the 1952–1954 Studebaker Starliner and the Lockheed L-1649A airplane. 

Characterized by their thin roof pillars, fastback styling and slippery aerodynamics, they symbolized 1960s Jet Age design. While the '60 and '61 body styles share only their roof lines and chassis, they did share the same overall styling concept.

The base engine in the 1960 and 1961 models was the aging 292 CID Y-block V-8, with the optional 352 motor that was originally introduced in 1958. In 1961 Ford offered the new Thunderbird 390 cubic-inch motor in three versions with the top line offering in 375 horsepower. There was also a dealer option for a 6V-401 HP that came with a three-2 barrel manifold and carb setup in the trunk to be installed by the dealer or the buyer.

In 1962 the Galaxie 500 (and 500 XL) replaced the Starliner as the top offering. Ford built 68,641 Starliners in 1960 and 29,669 in 1961.

Motorsport
The Starliner offered a suitable platform for NASCAR teams to build their race cars. They were produced in limited numbers and due to their racing applications few survivors exist today. For 1962, Ford initially proposed a "Starlift" removable slant back, but the car was dropped after one race.  Finally in 1963, Ford introduced a fastback version of the Galaxie called the "1963 1/2 Sports Hardtop," which featured a NASCAR-inspired 1-inch lowered roofline.

References

External links

Starliner
Rear-wheel-drive vehicles
Cars introduced in 1960